Peter Monks (born 3 October 1986) is a former footballer who played left back.

Born in England, he represented the British Virgin Islands at international level.

Club career
Born in Truro, Monks has played club football for Exeter City, Dorchester Town, Taunton Town, Bridgwater Town, Weston-super-Mare, Paulton Rovers and Chippenham Town.

Monks re-joined Bridgwater Town in 2011 following a two-year spell living in Australia.

He signed a new contract with Weston-super-Mare in June 2013. Whilst at the club he had loan spells with Paulton Rovers and Chippenham Town during the 2013–14 season, before moving to Chippenham on a permanent basis the following season.

International career
He made his international debut for the British Virgin Islands in 2015. He was invited to represent the nation by Daniel Barker, whose cousin works for the BVI Football Association.

References

1986 births
Living people
English footballers
British Virgin Islands footballers
British Virgin Islands international footballers
Exeter City F.C. players
Dorchester Town F.C. players
Taunton Town F.C. players
Bridgwater Town F.C. players
Weston-super-Mare A.F.C. players
Paulton Rovers F.C. players
Chippenham Town F.C. players
Association football fullbacks
National League (English football) players